West Lake is a man-made recreational lake in Huicheng District of Huizhou, Guangdong, China. It has been designated as a National AAAAA-level Scenic Spot.

History
During the Eastern Han dynasty (25–220), West Lake is a field of wilderness. 

In the Eastern Jin dynasty (317–420), a Buddhist temple named "Longxing Temple" was built near the lake. 

Emperor Xuanzong (712–756) changed Longxing Temple to "Kaiyuan Temple" in the Tang dynasty (618–907). During the reign of Emperor Zhongzong (684), Sizhou Tower was completed in West Mountain. 

In the Northern Song dynasty (960–1127), General Zhang Zhaoyuan honored the lake as "Langguan Lake". In 1066, Magistrate Chen Cheng enlarged the lake and added several bridges, towers and pavilions, during that time, the lake more commonly known as "Feng Lake" (Feng means a bumper harvest.) In 1094, Su Shi was exiled to Huizhou, where he lived for three years. Su Shi wrote a lot of poetry about West Lake. In his poem Presenting Tanxiu, he compared Feng Lake to West Lake in Hangzhou, which became the earliest record of the name of West Lake. In 1096, the locals erected causeway named "Su Causeway" and the Xixin Bridge in memory of Su Shi. That same year, Wang Zhaoyun, the most beloved concubine of Su Shi, was buried in the side of West Lake. Su Shi established a pavilion named "Liuru Pavilion" to commemorate her.

In 1244, in the 4th year of Chunyou period of the Southern Song dynasty (1127–1279), locals founded the Juxian Hall within the West Lake, which was renamed "Fenghu Academy" later. It is the highest school during the Ming (1368–1644) and Qing dynasties (1644–1911). Now the Fenghu Academy was rebuilt in 1801 by Magistrate Yi Bingshou.

From the 1950s to the 1980s, the area of the West Lake has been reduced by 46% because of real estate development. In 2007, the Huizhou Municipal Government has allocated 150 million yuan for the reconstruction project. Starting from the 1970s the water quality of the lake has deteriorated due to sewage flowing into its basin, resulting in high concentration of nutrients and eutrophication. However, in 2018 a basin of the lake has been successfully restored, using the method of biomanipulation.

Geography
The West Lake is divided into the South Lake, Feng Lake, Ping Lake, E Lake and Ling Lake.

The West Lake is in the subtropical monsoon climate zone, enjoying ample sunshine and abundant precipitation.

Tourist attractions

Six lakes
 South Lake
 Feng Lake
 Ping Lake
 E Lake 
 Ling Lake
 Honghua Lake

Nine bridges
 Gongbei Bridge
 Xixin Bridge
 Mingsheng Bridge
 Yuantong Bridge
 Yanxia Bridge
 Yingxian Bridge
 Jiuqu Bridge
 Pipa Bridge
 Huazhou Bridge

Natural history
As of 2004, West Lake has 117 species of phytoplankton, 127 species of plants, 50 species of birds, 50 species of reptiles and amphibians, and over 50 species of fish.

Gallery

References

External links
   

Lakes of Guangdong
Huizhou